The 2022 Pan American Weightlifting Championships were held in Bogotá, Colombia from 24 to 29 July 2022.

Medal summary

Men

Women

Medal table
Ranking by Big (Total result) medals

Ranking by all medals: Big (Total result) and Small (Snatch and Clean & Jerk)

Team ranking

Men

Women

References

External links
Results
Results book

Pan American Weightlifting Championships
Pan American Weightlifting Championships
Pan American Weightlifting Championships
International weightlifting competitions hosted by Colombia
Sports competitions in Bogotá
Pan American Weightlifting Championships